Patrick Croskerry (born 7 October 1942), M.D., Ph.D., FRCP, is a former Canadian rower and Director of the Critical Thinking Program within the Division of Medical Education, Dalhousie University. He competed in the men's eight event at the 1976 Summer Olympics.

Education
Croskerry was born in Deal, United Kingdom. From 1953 to 1960, he attended Dover Grammar School for Boys. Croskerry subsequently studied at the University of Aberdeen where he obtained his B.Sc., before gaining an M.D. and Ph.D. from McMaster University, Canada.

Rowing career
Croskerry learnt to row in Deal. In Aberdeen, he competed at the Scottish trials and in a representative Scottish eight. In Canada, Croskerry joined the Leander rowing club in Hamilton. He competed at the Royal Canadian Henley Regatta in 1974 which led to subsequent selection for the Canadian national rowing squad and participation in the 1975 World Championships. In 1976, Croskerry's final international representation was at the 1976 Summer Olympic Games in the Canadian men's coxed eight.

Academic career
Trained as an experimental psychologist, Croskerry now has an international reputation in Emergency Medicine, Patient Health and Safety, and medical decision making, including cognitive bias.

References

External links
 

1942 births
Living people
Canadian male rowers
People educated at Dover Grammar School for Boys
Olympic rowers of Canada
Rowers at the 1976 Summer Olympics
Sportspeople from Dover, Kent